The 2020 Uzbekistan Pro League is the 29th since its establishment in 1992. The competition started on 17 March 2020.

Teams

Managerial changes

Foreign Players

League table

Results

Goals
 First goal of the season: Jamshid Qabulov for Neftchi against Dinamo

Goalscorers

See also
2020 Uzbekistan Super League 
2020 Uzbekistan First League 
2020 Uzbekistan Second League
2020 Uzbekistan Cup 
2020 Uzbekistan League Cup

References

External links 
9 март куни Про-лига янги мавсумига қуръа ташланади 
А ва В Про-лига иштирокчилари секин-аста сараланмоқда 
Лига кубоги-2020 тақвими тасдиқланди 

Uzbekistan
2020
2020 in Uzbekistani football leagues